Hyperodapedontinae is a subfamily of rhynchosaurs within the family Hyperodapedontidae. Fossils have been found from Argentina, Brazil, Canada, India, Madagascar, Scotland, Tanzania, United States and Zimbabwe.

Phylogeny
Hyperodapedontinae was erected by Sankar Chatterjee in 1969 as a coordinate name of the family Hyperodapedontidae Lydekker, 1985. Chatterjee (1969) originally named Hyperodapedontinae to include all Late Triassic rhynchosaurs known at that time, H. gordoni, H. huxleyi and "Scaphonyx" fischeri, and proposed a morphological diagnosis for the clade. Scaphonyx includes two additional species, S. africanus and S. australis, all of which are currently believed to be dubious. As noted by Langer et al. (2000), using Chatterjee' morphological definition would exclude Teyumbaita and H. huenei from the clade, and thus it would be nested within Hyperodapedon. To preserve the name, with its original stratigraphical meaning, Langer et al. (2000) redefined Hyperodapedontinae as a stem-based taxon that includes "all rhynchosaurs closer to Hyperodapedon than to "Rhynchosaurus" spenceri (now Fodonyx)".

The cladogram below follows Mukherjee & Ray (2014):

 Valid species that were first assigned to Scaphonyx.

References

Rhynchosaurs
Carnian first appearances
Norian extinctions
Fossil taxa described in 1969
Taxa named by Sankar Chatterjee